Gruyère is a hard Swiss cheese that originated in the cantons of Fribourg, Vaud, Neuchâtel, Jura, and Berne in Switzerland. It is named after the town of Gruyères in Fribourg. In 2001, Gruyère gained the appellation d'origine contrôlée (AOC), which became the appellation d'origine protégée (AOP) as of 2013.

Gruyère is classified as a Swiss-type or Alpine cheese and is sweet but slightly salty, with a flavour that varies widely with age. It is often described as creamy and nutty when young, becoming more assertive, earthy, and complex as it matures. When fully aged (five months to a year), it tends to have small cracks that impart a slightly grainy texture. Unlike Emmental, with which it is often confused, modern Gruyère has few if any eyes, although in the 19th century, this was not always the case.  It is the most popular Swiss cheese in Switzerland, and in most of Europe.

Uses
Gruyère is used in many ways in countless dishes. It is considered a good cheese for baking, because of its distinctive but not overpowering taste. For example in quiche, Gruyère adds savoriness without overshadowing the other ingredients. It is a good melting cheese, particularly suited for fondues, along with Vacherin Fribourgeois and Emmental. It is also traditionally used in French onion soup, as well as in croque-monsieur, a classic French toasted ham and cheese sandwich. Gruyère is also used in chicken and veal cordon bleu. It is a fine table cheese, and when grated, it is often used with salads and pastas. It is used, grated, atop le tourin, a garlic soup from France served on dried bread. White wines, such as Riesling, pair well with Gruyère. Sparkling cider and Bock beer are also beverage affinities.

Production

The curd is cut up into pea-sized pieces and stirred, releasing whey.

The whey is strained, and the curds placed into moulds to be pressed. After salting in brine and smearing with bacteria, the cheese is ripened for two months at room temperature, generally on wooden boards, turning every couple of days to ensure even moisture distribution. Gruyère can be cured for 3 to 10 months, with long curing producing a cheese of intense flavour.

Affinage

An important and the longest part of the production of Gruyère in Switzerland is the affinage (French for 'maturation').

According to the AOC, the cellars to mature a Swiss Gruyère must have a climate close to a natural cave. This means that the humidity should be between 94% and 98%. If the humidity is lower, the cheese dries out. If the humidity is too high, the cheese does not mature and becomes smeary and gluey. This relatively high temperature is required for excellent-quality cheese. The lower the temperature, the less the cheese matures, resulting in a harder and more crumbly texture.

Legal protection

Switzerland
In 2001, Gruyère gained the Appellation d'origine contrôlée (now designated Appellation d'origine protégée) status. Since then, the production and the maturation have been strictly defined, and all Swiss Gruyère producers must follow these rules.

France
Although Gruyère is recognised as a Swiss Geographical Indication in the EU, Gruyère of French origin is also protected as a Protected Geographical Indication (PGI) in the EU. To avoid confusion, the EU PGI Gruyère must indicate that it comes from France and must make sure it cannot be confused with Gruyère from Switzerland. It, therefore, is generally sold as "French Gruyère".

United States 
In 2021, a U.S. District Court ruled that the term "gruyere" had become a generic term for a certain type of cheese, and Swiss and French Gruyère producers' associations could not register it as a trademark in the United States. The U.S. Court of Appeals for the Fourth Circuit affirmed that decision in March 2023.

Varieties

Gruyere (as a Swiss AOC) has many varieties with different age profiles, and an organic version of the cheese is also sold. A special variety is produced only in summer in the Swiss Alps and is branded as Le Gruyère Switzerland AOC Alpage.

Generally, one can distinguish the age profiles of mild/doux (minimum five months old) and réserve, also known as surchoix (minimum ten months old). In Switzerland, other age profiles can be found, including mi-salé (7–8 months), salé (9–10 months), vieux (14 months), and Höhlengereift (cave aged), but these age profiles are not part of the AOC.

Le Gruyère AOP Premier Cru

It is the only cheese that has won the title of the best cheese in the world at the World Cheese Awards five times: in 1992, 2002, 2005, 2015, and 2022.

Similar cheeses
L'Etivaz is a very similar Swiss hard cheese from the canton of Vaud. It is made from raw cow's milk and is very similar to aged Gruyère in taste. In the 1930s, a group of 76 Gruyère producing families felt that government regulations were allowing cheesemakers to compromise the qualities that made good Gruyère so special. They withdrew from the government's Gruyère program, and "created" their own cheese - L'Etivaz - named for the village around which they all lived. They founded a cooperative in 1932, and the first cheese cellars were built in 1934.

The French Le Brouère cheese, made in nearby Vosges, is considered a variant of Gruyère.

Γραβιέρα (graviera) is a popular Greek cheese which resembles Gruyère and is an EU Protected Designation of Origin. There are Naxian varieties (produced from cow's milk) that tend to be milder and sweeter, and various gravieras from Crete, which are produced from sheep's milk.

Kars gravyer cheese is a Turkish cheese made of cow's milk or a mixture of cow's and goat's milk. Gruyère-style cheeses are also produced in the United States, with Wisconsin having the largest output, and in Bosnia under the name Livanjski sir (Livno cheese).

See also
 
 
 Swiss cheeses and dairy products

Notes and references

External links

 Official website of Le Gruyère AOC
 Gruyère cheese in the online Culinary Heritage of Switzerland database.
An article on the history and controversy of Swiss versus French claims to Gruyère cheese.

Swiss cheeses
Cow's-milk cheeses
Culinary Heritage of Switzerland
Smear-ripened cheeses
Canton of Fribourg